For the settlement established by former slaves in Guyana known as Victoria Village see Victoria, Guyana

Victoria Village, sometimes referred to as Sloane (after the main street within the area), is a neighbourhood in the city of Toronto, Ontario, Canada bounded on the west by the Don Valley, on the north by Lawrence Avenue East, on the east by Victoria Park Avenue, and on the south by Eglinton Avenue East, although there is a small area south of Eglinton to Sunrise Avenue that is sometimes included. It is located in the southeast of the former city of North York. Its population is diverse in ancestral backgrounds with a larger proportion of South Americans than most of the city.

History
Much of the neighbourhood was originally owned by the Herron family, who operated an orchard on the property. Many apple trees can still be found in the neighbourhood. The area was developed in the 1950s by a group of investors led by Progressive Conservative MP Robert Henry McGregor.

Historically the area was served by Herron Valley Junior High School, now closed. The name Herron Valley comes from the Herron family who historically owned land in the area. The original home is still standing and is located on Woodthorpe Road close to Victoria Park Avenue.  There remain stands of apple trees (now wild) in the valley area near Anewen Drive and Sweeney Drive, which are remnants of orchards that were once owned by the Herron family.

Development

The neighbourhood has many high- and low-rise buildings, which are located on the edges of the neighbourhood, with mostly bungalows, some semi-detached homes, and some two-storey detached (either rebuilt bungalows, or built after the initial period of construction, which occurred mostly from the late 1950s-1960s). Apartments and condos are mostly located on the borders of the area, Lawrence, Eglinton and Victoria Park Avenues. Several commercial buildings are also present along the Don Valley Parkway, near Eglinton Avenue.

The neighbourhood borders the Don River, and some of the homes have views overlooking the Don Valley, which forms a part of the Toronto ravine system. A portion of the single detached homes in the area abut valley areas, including the Charles Sauriol Conservation Reserve.

Education
Two public school boards operate elementary schools in Victoria Village, the English first language Toronto District School Board (TDSB), and the French first language Conseil scolaire Viamonde (CSV). CSV operates one public elementary school École élémentaire Jeanne-Lajoie, located on Carnforth Road. TDSB operates two elementary schools, Sloane Public School, located on a street of the same name, and Victoria Village Public School, located on Sweeney Drive.

Neither school board operates a secondary school in the neighbourhood, with CSV and TDSB secondary school students that reside in Victoria Village attending secondary institutions in adjacent neighbourhoods. The separate school boards Conseil scolaire catholique MonAvenir (CSCM), and the Toronto Catholic District School Board (TCDSB) also provides school for residents of the neighbourhood. However, neither operates a school in the neighbourhood, with CSCM and TCDSB students attending schools situated in other neighbourhoods in Toronto.

Recreation

Victoria Village is also home to the Victoria Village branch of the Toronto Public Library, located at the intersection of Sloane Avenue and Sweeney Drive. This library branch was founded in 1967 as a branch of the North York Public Library, and was renovated in 1996.

Victoria Village Public Arena is the local skating and hockey arena for Victoria Village. It is located just south of Eglinton Avenue.

The neighbourhood is also home to a number of municipal parks, including the Anewen Greenbelt, Charles Sauriol Conservation Area, and Wigmore Park. Green spaces such as Anewen Greenbelt make up portions of the Toronto ravine system. Municipal parks in Victoria Village are managed by the Toronto Parks, Forestry and Recreation Division.

Transportation
The main streets are Victoria Park Avenue, a major north-south arterial road to the east, Eglinton Avenue East, a major east-west arterial road to the south, and Lawrence Avenue East, a major east-west arterial road to the north. TTC bus routes that serve the community are 24A/B Victoria Park, 34A/B Eglinton East, 54A/B Lawrence East, 70A/B O'Connor, 91C/D Woodbine, and 924 Victoria Park Express. The Eglinton LRT known as Eglinton Crosstown line, which was to be completed 2021, is also set to run through the community.

References

Neighbourhoods in Toronto
North York